Johnny Johnson and the Bandwagon were an American vocal soul group, prominent in the late 1960s and early 1970s.

Career
Originally known simply as The Bandwagon, they were formed in 1967 and featured Artie Fullilove, Billy Bradley, Terry Lewis and lead singer Johnny Johnson (born Johnny Mathis, 20 July 1944, Florida, raised in Rochester, New York).

They had their first major UK hit in October 1968 with "Breakin' Down the Walls of Heartache", written and produced by Sandy Linzer and Denny Randell, on the Direction label, part of CBS, which reached number 4 on the UK Singles Chart.

In 1969 the group disbanded, and all subsequent releases were billed as Johnny Johnson and His Bandwagon. In effect, the act was basically Johnson plus additional vocalists, who were hired for recording, touring and TV performances. Because they had been so much more successful in Britain and Europe, they based themselves in London, with songwriter Tony Macaulay being primarily responsible for the next stage of their career. They had top ten hits with "Sweet Inspiration" (1970), and "(Blame It) On the Pony Express" (1970). The latter track was written by Macaulay, Roger Cook and Roger Greenaway.

Their recording career continued through the 1970s, with a 1971 LP Soul Survivor, produced by Macaulay, as well as subsequent, less successful singles that year including "Sally Put Your Red Shoes On" and a cover version of the Bob Dylan song, "Mr Tambourine Man", on the Bell label.

They left Bell, for further singles including "Honey Bee" (1972), on Stateside Records, and "Music to My Heart" (1975), a cover of the Patti Austin 1960's ABC Records single, on Epic Records, produced by Biddu. This was also reissued as the B-side to the 1975 reissue of "Breakin' Down The Walls Of Heartache", also on Epic.

Their early hits are still revered as Northern soul classics, as they espoused a more commercial pop-soul style similar in sound to that of early Tamla Motown, as opposed to the more funky progressive style favoured by contemporaries like Sly & the Family Stone and The Isley Brothers.

"Breakin' Down the Walls of Heartache" enjoyed a new lease of life in 1980, when covered by Dexys Midnight Runners on the b-side of "Geno", and as an album track in 1981 on a solo album by Bram Tchaikovsky, formerly of The Motors. It was also popular in UK soul clubs, during the early 1980s.

Johnson had not been well for several years, and the pressures of constantly touring during the early 1970s took a heavy toll. He retired to Rochester and is reputed to have died from cancer in 1979. Their frontman is not to be confused with Chuck Berry's sideman, Johnnie Johnson.

Discography

Albums
 Bandwagon: Johnny Johnson and the Bandwagon (Direction 8-63500, 1968)
"Breakin’ Down The Walls Of Heartache"; "When Love Has Gone Away"; "Stoned Soul Picnic"; "I Wish It Would Rain"; "You Blew Your Cool & Lost Your Fool"; "You"; "People Got To Be Free"; "Girl From Harlem"; "Are You Ready For This"; "I Ain't Lyin’"; "Don't Let It In"; "Baby Make Your Own Sweet Music"
 Johnny Johnson and His Bandwagon: Soul Survivor (Bell SBLL 1138, 1971)
"(Blame It) On The Pony Express"; "Love is Blue (L'amour Est Bleu)"; "Gasoline Alley Bred"; "He Ain't Heavy, He's My Brother"; "Sweet Inspiration"; "In The Bad Old Days (Before You Loved Me)"; "United We Stand"; "Games People Play"; "Something"; "Pride Comes Before A Fall"; "Never Let Her Go"
 Johnny Johnson and His Bandwagon: Breakin’ Down The Walls Of Heartache (Ace CDKEND 307, 2008) - compilation
"Breakin' Down The Walls Of Heartache"; "When Love Has Gone Away"; "Let's Hang On"; "Stoned Soul Picnic"; " I Ain't Lyin'"; "Baby Make Your Own Sweet Music"; "On The Day We Fall In Love"; "Dancin' Master"; " I Wish It Would Rain"; "You Blew Your Cool And Lost Your Fool"; "Are You Ready For This"; "People Got To Be Free"; "Don't Let It In"; "You"; "Girl From Harlem"; "Sweet Inspiration"; "In The Bad Bad Old Days (Before You Loved Me)"; "United We Stand"; "Sally Out Your Red Shoes On"; "Mr. Tambourine Man"; "Blame It (On The Pony Express"; "Gasoline Alley Bred"; "High And Dry"; "Music To My Heart"

Singles

See also
List of performers on Top of the Pops

Notes

References

American soul musical groups
Musical groups established in 1967
Northern soul musicians